Safdarabad, is an administrative subdivision (Tehsil) of Sheikhupura District in the Punjab province of Pakistan. The city of Safdar Abad is the headquarters of the tehsil, until 2005 it was a tehsil of Sheikhupura District, but in that year Sheikhpura was bifurcated and the district of Nankana Sahib was created. - with Safdarabad as one of its tehsils. Now at present (since 01-12-2012), once again Safdarabad has been rejoined with Sheikhupura as a Tehsil. The city of Safdarabad lies 95 km from Lahore the provincial capital of Punjab. The tehsil has a population of more than 270,000 the majority of whom are Muslims.

Economy 
Agriculture is one of the main sources of employment, the town has been a popular grain market for last 75 years as the town is located in a highly fertile area. The Rakh Branch canal passes near one side of the Safdarabad city to Sangla Hill and is an irrigation source. On the other hand, a large variety of shoes is prepared here and transported to different cities.

Shiblee college for women safdrabad

Education 
There are many educational institutes in city Safdarabad. 
wisdom Inn public school
 Faran leadership school
 Afzal ideal public school
 Green Field Academy School
 Quaid-e-Azam Ideal Public School - QAIPS
 Al-Rehman School of Alpha Studies (ASAS)
 Eden Public School
 Government associate college for women Safdarabad
 Government High School ( boys) Hospital road Safdarabad
 Govt. Vocational Training Institute for Girls
 Divisional Public School-DPS
 Punjab Public High School
 Safdarabad College of Commerce
 Gazali School System Safdar Abad
 Al-khidmat foundation Safdar Abad
 Child care foundation
 Siddique Public school
 Government Usmania Islamia high school Nawanpind.
 Talha Irtsam Academy
 Qasim Public School (QPS) Nawankot
Pakistan Model Secondary School
Salman Public School (Nawan Pind Chak 78R.B)
Minhaj Ul Qur'aan Model Secondary School
New asas high school
City star school
Government associate college for boys Sangla hill road Safdarabad

Railway station
The central railway station is the main railway station of Safdarabad built during the British region around the nineteenth century. The station is used to take people to all parts of Pakistan from Karachi, Lahore, Rawalpindi, Quetta, Peshawar and many more cities and towns of Pakistan by Rail.

A large amount of cargo is daily exported and imported into Safdarabad with many deliveries a day from all parts of the Punjab Province.

Boutter  Market
This market is situated right in the middle of the city. It consist of around 350 shops and there is a mosque in the center of market. UBL, Boutter marriage hall, Boutter cable network and utility store are the salient feature of this market.

Hameed Garden
A residential and commercial town in Safdarabad with great location and facilities. Hameed Garden was named after Mr. Rana Abdul Hameed Khan.

Darbar (Mazarat)
There are many mazarat in the city and its surrounding areas. One of the most holy Darbar (Shrine) is located in village Dhaban Khurd near Safdarabad city. Evey year a grand Urs is held there, where hundreds of followers come to celebrate it. The celebrations of this Urs continues for two days. This is the village where Hazrat Syed Bahadar Ali Shah Gilani (Qadri, Noshai), father of Syed Ehsan Ali Bahadar spent many years and did guide the people toward spiritual knowledge.
There are two graves in the shrine: One belongs to Baba Nazam Din Shah who is Gujjar by caste and the Khalifa of Syed Maoj Ali Shah of Village Jiwan Pur Gujjran Tehsil Garhshankar distt. Hoshiarpur India. While the second grave belongs to Hazrat Syed Karam Ali Shah Gilani died approximately 300 years ago. Syed Karam Ali Shah Gilani is the son of Hazrat Mubarak Shah Haqani whose holy shrine is in the city of Uch, Bahawalpur

References

Tehsils of Sheikhupura District